Congenital malformations of the dermatoglyphs are a cutaneous condition divided into four main categories based on the appearance of the dermal ridges of which they are composed: (1) ridge aplasia; (2) ridge hypoplasia; (3) ridge dissociation; and (4) ridges-off-the-end.

See also 
 Melanotic neuroectodermal tumor of infancy
 List of cutaneous conditions

References

External links 

Cutaneous congenital anomalies